Acemyini is a small but cosmopolitan tribe of flies in the family Tachinidae. Like all tachinid flies, acemyiines are parasitoids of other invertebrates. Specifically, the acemyiines are parasitoids of Orthoptera in the families Acrididae and Eumastacidae.

Identification
The Acemyiini have a distinctive pattern of scutellar bristling among the Tachinidae, comprising three pairs of very strong setae; one pair of crossed apical setae, a diverging subapical pair set unusually far forwards, and a basal pair which may be approximately parallel or converging. Most species have a long series of proclinate orbital setae in both sexes. The basal node of vein R4+5 in acemyiines has one pair of very long setulae - one on each surface of the wing - which is uncommon in the Goniinae.

Genera
Acemya Robineau-Desvoidy, 1830
Atlantomyia Crosskey, 1977
Ceracia Rondani, 1865
Charitella Mesnil, 1957
Eoacemyia Townsend, 1926
Hygiella Mesnil, 1957
Metacemyia Herting, 1969

References

Exoristinae
Brachycera tribes
Taxa named by Friedrich Moritz Brauer
Taxa named by Julius von Bergenstamm